The Road Goes On Forever was The Allman Brothers Band's first compilation album, a two-LP set released in 1975. It featured songs from the Allmans' first five albums. In 2001, an expanded edition was released featuring 13 more tracks. The album's title is a line from "Midnight Rider."

Track listing

Side 1
"Black Hearted Woman" (Gregg Allman) – 5:18
"Dreams" (Gregg Allman) – 7:19
"Whipping Post" (Gregg Allman) – 5:22
"Midnight Rider" (Gregg Allman, Robert Payne) – 3:00

Side 2
"Statesboro Blues" (Live) (Blind Willie McTell) – 4:20
"Stormy Monday" (Live) (T-Bone Walker) – 8:50
"Hoochie Coochie Man" (Willie Dixon) – 4:58
"Stand Back" (Gregg Allman, Berry Oakley) – 3:26

Side 3
"One Way Out" (Live) (Elmore James, Marshall Sehorn, Sonny Boy Williamson II) – 5:00
"Blue Sky" (Dickey Betts) – 5:11
"Hot 'Lanta" (Live) (Duane Allman, Gregg Allman, Dickey Betts, Berry Oakley, Butch Trucks, Jai Johanny Johanson) – 5:22
"Ain't Wastin' Time No More" (Gregg Allman) – 3:40
"Melissa" (Gregg Allman, Steve Alaimo) – 3:54

Side 4
"Wasted Words" (Gregg Allman) – 4:20
"Jessica" (Dickey Betts) – 7:30
"Ramblin' Man" (Dickey Betts) – 4:50
"Little Martha" (Duane Allman) – 2:10

Record 1, Side 1, Tracks 1–3 from The Allman Brothers Band (1969)
Record 1, Side 1, Track 4 and Record 1, Side 2, Track 3 from Idlewild South (1970)
Record 1, Side 2, Tracks 1–2 and Record 2, Side 1, Track 3 from At Fillmore East (1971)
Record 1, Side 2, Track 4/Record 2, Side 1, Tracks 1–2 and 4–5 and Record 2, Side 2, Track 4 from Eat a Peach (1972)
Record 2, Side 2, Tracks 1–3 from Brothers and Sisters (1973)

Live Songs
Record 1, Side 2, Tracks 1–2 and Record 2, Side 1, Track 3 recorded 3/1971 at the Fillmore East in New York, NY
Record 2, Side 1, Track 1 recorded 6/27/1971 at the Fillmore East in New York, NY

2001 Expanded Edition Track Listing

Disc One
"Don't Want You No More" (Spencer Davis, Edward Hardin) – 2:25
"It's Not My Cross to Bear" (Gregg Allman) – 4:57
"Black Hearted Woman" (Gregg Allman) – 5:18
"Trouble No More" (Muddy Waters) – 3:49
"Dreams" (Gregg Allman) – 7:19
"Whipping Post" (Gregg Allman) – 5:22
"Revival" (Dickey Betts) – 4:05
"Midnight Rider" (Gregg Allman, Robert Payne) – 3:00
"Don't Keep Me Wonderin'" (Gregg Allman) – 3:31
"Hoochie Coochie Man" (Willie Dixon) – 4:58
"Statesboro Blues" (Live-3/1971 at the Fillmore East in New York, NY) (Blind Willie McTell) – 4:20
"Stormy Monday" (Live-3/13/1971 at the Fillmore East in New York, NY) (T-Bone Walker) – 8:50
"Hot 'Lanta" (Live-3/1971 at the Fillmore East in New York, NY) (Duane Allman, Gregg Allman, Dickey Betts, Berry Oakley, Butch Trucks, Jai Johanny Johanson) – 5:22
"In Memory of Elizabeth Reed" (Live-3/1971 at the Fillmore East in New York, NY) (Dickey Betts) – 13:05

Disc Two
"One Way Out" (Live-6/27/1971 at the Fillmore East in New York, NY) (Elmore James, Marshall Sehorn, Sonny Boy Williamson II) – 5:00
"Ain't Wastin' Time No More" (Gregg Allman) – 3:40
"Melissa" (Gregg Allman, Steve Alaimo) – 3:54
"Stand Back" (Gregg Allman, Berry Oakley) – 3:26
"Blue Sky" (Dickey Betts) – 5:11
"Little Martha" (Duane Allman) – 2:10
"Wasted Words" (Gregg Allman) – 4:20
"Ramblin' Man" (Dickey Betts) – 4:50
"Southbound" (Dickey Betts) – 5:10
"Jessica" (Dickey Betts) – 7:30
"Come and Go Blues" (Live-7/28/1973 at the Racecourse in Watkins Glen, NY) (Gregg Allman) – 5:03
"Can't Lose What You Never Had" (Muddy Waters) – 5:54
"Win, Lose or Draw" (Gregg Allman) – 4:47
"Crazy Love" (Dickey Betts) – 3:45
"Can't Take It With You" (Dickey Betts, Don Johnson) – 3:36
"Pegasus" (Dickey Betts) – 7:31

Disc 1, Tracks 1–6 from The Allman Brothers Band (1969)
Disc 1, Tracks 7–10 from Idlewild South (1970)
Disc 1, Tracks 11–14 from At Fillmore East (1971)
Disc 2, Tracks 1–6 from Eat a Peach (1972)
Disc 2, Track 7–10 from Brothers and Sisters (1973)
Disc 2, Track 11 from Wipe the Windows, Check the Oil, Dollar Gas (1976)
Disc 2, Tracks 12–13 from Win, Lose or Draw (1975)
Disc 2, Tracks 14–16 from Enlightened Rogues (1979)

References

1975 compilation albums
Albums produced by Tom Dowd
Capricorn Records compilation albums
The Allman Brothers Band compilation albums